Typhoon Cary, known as Typhoon Ising in the Philippines, was the second of two tropical cyclones to affect Vietnam in a week. An area of disturbed weather developed southwest of Pohnpei on August 6, 1987. The system initially remained disorganized, but by August 14, Cary had attained tropical storm intensity. After initially moving north-northwest, Cary turned west-northwest, although intensification was slow to occur. On August 15, Cary was upgraded into a typhoon, and on August 17, the typhoon peaked in intensity. Typhoon Cary then made landfall in northern Luzon while at peak intensity. Across the Philippines, 954 houses were damaged and an additional 89 were destroyed, which left 55,567 people, or 13,247 families that were either homeless or otherwise sought shelter. Five people died in the country while damage totaled $5.58 million (1987 USD), including $1.45 million from agriculture and $4.13 million from infrastructure. The storm weakened over land, but re-intensified into a typhoon over the South China Sea. On August 21, Typhoon Cary passed just south of Hainan, where hundreds of homes were damaged but no fatalities occurred, and subsequently entered the Gulf of Tonkin. The storm weakened as it approached Vietnam, and on August 23, the storm dissipated inland over Laos. Across Vietnam, almost  of land were flooded or destroyed. Twenty people were killed and many others were injured.

Meteorological history

The next day, the Joint Typhoon Warning Center (JTWC) started watching the system. On August 8, the Japan Meteorological Agency (JMA) followed suit. Over the ensuing four days, the storm's circulation remained broad and its convection was poorly organized. On August 12, upper-level outflow improved in all four quadrants, which resulted in the JTWC issuing a Tropical Cyclone Formation Alert (TCFA). However, post-season analysis by the JTWC revealed that this occurred at 12:00 UTC on August 12.

Following behind Typhoon Betty, Cary initially moved north-northwest, only to turn west-northwest under the influence of a subtropical ridge to the storm's north. Initially, Betty's outflow inhibited development, but conditions aloft became more favorable once Betty weakened and passed over the Philippines. Dvorak intensity estimates suggested that the typhoon began to rapidly intensify. However, a Hurricane Hunter aircraft fix around midday on August 14 revealed that the storm was actually weakening and its center was becoming difficult to locate. Despite these developments, the JMA upgraded Cary into a tropical storm at noon that day. Around this time, the Philippine Atmospheric, Geophysical and Astronomical Services Administration (PAGASA) also started tracking the storm and assigned it with the name Ising. Early on August 15, the JTWC reported that Cary attained typhoon intensity, while the JMA upgraded Cary into a severe tropical storm. This was significantly lower than the Dvorak-based  operational estimate from the JTWC. At around 12:00 UTC on August 16, the JMA classified Cary as a typhoon. Shortly thereafter, a ragged eye appeared on satellite imagery.

Shortly after attaining maximum intensity, Typhoon Cary turned slightly south of west and made landfall on eastern Luzon. Cary weakened steadily over land, and both the JMA and JTWC estimated that Cary weakened below typhoon intensity. After entering the South China Sea, however, Cary turned west and began to re-intensify. On the morning of August 19, the JMA re-upgraded Cary into a typhoon, with the JTWC following suit 36 hours later. Accelerating towards the west, Typhoon Cary emerged into the Gulf of Tonkin before making landfall at noon on August 12 in northern Vietnam. The remnants of Cary eventually tracked into Burma before losing its identity.

Preparations and impact

Philippines
Typhoon Cary threatened the Philippines less than a week after the country was devastated by Typhoon Betty. To avoid a repeat of Betty, much of northern Luzon was placed under a typhoon alert. Storm warnings were issued for the metropolitan area of Manila. Philippine Airlines canceled flights between Manila and three cities in northern Luzon. Schools were closed in several provinces over the northern portion of Luzon.

Near where the typhoon moved ashore, in Dagupan, authorities shut off water and electricity. The typhoon leveled a banana plantation in the Pangasinan province and caused floods that damaged two bridges in Ilocos and Cagayan provinces. Across the capital city of Manila, heavy rains led to street flooding. Nationwide, 954 homes were damaged and an additional 89 were destroyed, which resulted in 55,567 people or 13,247 families that either south shelter or were homeless. Five people were killed in the country. The storm inflicted $5.58 million in damage to the country, including $1.45 million from agriculture and $4.13 million from infrastructure.

Elsewhere
The typhoon passed close to Hainan Island on August 21, where hurricane-force winds and torrential rain resulted in the disruption of water and electrical services. After passing Hainan Island, the storm passed close enough to prompt a No 1. hurricane signal for Hong Kong, but this warning was dropped on August 20 as the storm receded. Throughout the vicinity of Hong Kong, no deaths or damage were reported.

Cary struck Vietnam six days after Betty, resulting in additional flooding rains across the area. Throughout the coastal provinces of Thanh Hoa, Ha Nam Ninh, Thai Binh and Haiphong, floodwaters from the storm overflowed dikes. There, the storm damaged many houses, warehouses, schools, and medical facilities. Further south,  of rice fields were inundated in Binh Tri Tien. Overall, 20 people were killed in the country and several others were injured.

See also

Typhoon Betty (1987)
Typhoon Dan (1989)
Tropical Storm Talas (2017)

Notes

References

Cary
Cary 1987
Typhoon Cary
Cary
Cary
Cary
Cary